Kish-Air Kish Football Club is an Iranian football club based in Kish, Iran. They currently compete in the Hormozogan Provincial League.

Season-by-season

The table below shows the achievements of the club in various competitions.

See also
 2011–12 Hazfi Cup

Football clubs in Iran
Association football clubs established in 2009
2009 establishments in Iran